Der Roland von Berlin is an opera in four acts by composer Ruggero Leoncavallo. The work uses a German-language libretto by Leoncavallo which is based on Willibald Alexis's 1840 historical novel of the same name. The opera premiered at the Königliches Opernhaus in Berlin on 13 December 1904. Its premiere in Italy was given at the Teatro di San Carlo in Naples the following month where it was sung in Italian with the title Rolando.

References

External link 
 

1904 operas
German-language operas
Operas
Operas by Ruggero Leoncavallo
Opera world premieres at the Berlin State Opera
Operas based on novels
German patriotic songs
Fiction set in 1422